Brideless Groom is a 1947 short subject directed by Edward Bernds starring American slapstick comedy team The Three Stooges (Moe Howard, Larry Fine and Shemp Howard). It is the 101st entry in the series released by Columbia Pictures starring the comedians, who released 190 shorts for the studio between 1934 and 1959.

Plot

Shemp is a voice instructor and the object of affection to his unattractive and tone-deaf vocal student Miss Dinkelmeyer, with Larry as his musical accompanist. After an excruciating session, Moe enters his classroom to tell Shemp that his uncle Caleb had died and left him an inheritance of $500,000 (about $6.4 million today). However, Shemp cannot collect the money unless he is married within 48 hours after the reading of the will, leaving him only a few hours to find a bride. Shemp uses his address book to call and propose to any and all women he has ever known in the phone booth, but he is unsuccessful. With time running out, Moe and Larry lead Shemp through a series of disastrous situations including the destruction of a phone booth and Shemp being beaten silly by a woman named Miss Hopkins, who had just moved into the building and mistook Shemp for her cousin Basil. As he gathers his thoughts, Shemp unintentionally proposes to Miss Dinkelmeyer. She happily accepts and the two of them, with Moe and Larry in tow, head over to the Justice of Peace to get married. Shemp pulls out the wedding ring but accidentally loses it in the piano. Moe forces him to look, and Shemp wrecks the piano before finding the ring.

Then, Shemp's landlord calls Moe to tell him that news of Shemp's inheritance was printed in the newspaper and all of Shemp's ex-girlfriends that he called earlier found out about it and are out looking for him. They all arrive at the Justice of Peace's office looking to marry Shemp to get his money, whereupon chaos ensues. The women start fighting, taking out their aggressions not only on each other but also upon Moe and Larry, who are repeatedly kicked in the shins while standing among the crowd of battling women, trying to break them up. Moe also sets a bear trap in a chair awaiting any of the women who are continually pushing one another into it, but the plan backfires as he tries to antagonize a combatant who shoves him backwards into the chair, causing the trap to painfully snap shut on him. Nonetheless, Shemp, in a dazed state, ends up marrying Miss Dinkelmeyer, just in time to collect the money. As Shemp comes to, he is told what has happened, and is frightened beyond reproach.

Cast

Credited
 Moe Howard as Moe
 Larry Fine as Larry
 Shemp Howard as Professor Shemp Howard
 Dee Green as Miss Dinkelmeyer
 Christine McIntyre as Miss Hopkins
 Doris Houck as Aggressive former girlfriend

Uncredited
 Emil Sitka as Justice of the Peace J.M. Benton
 Johnny Kascier as Bellboy
 Virginia Hunter as Shemp's former girlfriend
 Judy Malcolm as Shemp's former girlfriend
 Alyn Lockwood as Shemp's former girlfriend
 Bertha Priestley as Fat Woman in Hallway
 Nancy Saunders as Shemp's former girlfriend

Production notes
Brideless Groom was filmed on March 11–14, 1947. The plot theme of Brideless Groom is not unique, having been used in (among others) Buster Keaton's 1925 comedy Seven Chances (remade in 1999 as The Bachelor). Writer Clyde Bruckman was also partially responsible for Seven Chances. Brideless Groom would be recycled in the second half of the 1956 Stooge short Husbands Beware.

The film features longtime Stooges supporting player Emil Sitka's best-remembered line "Hold hands, you lovebirds!" (the line is actually engraved on Sitka's headstone). The shot where Sitka has a birdcage smashed on his head was worked into the 1994 movie Pulp Fiction when Eric Stoltz is watching television.

The version of "Voices of Spring" during Shemp and Miss Dinkelmeyer's singing lesson was sung by frequent Stooge co-star Christine McIntyre, who appears in this short as Miss Hopkins. This version of "Voices of Spring", along with McIntyre herself, were previously used in the Stooges' Micro-Phonies (1945).

Shemp's injury

Brideless Groom features a sequence with Christine McIntyre who portrays Miss Hopkins, a woman whom Shemp actively pursues for his wife. Unfortunately, she mistakes him for her cousin Basil. After learning her mistake, she takes it out on poor Shemp by slapping him silly, then finally punching him through her door. During the filming of the scene, when McIntyre threw her punch, she leaned too far into it and hit Shemp for real, ultimately breaking his nose. This mistake was left in the film, and when watched in slow motion, Shemp can be seen falling down and opening his mouth like he was yelling in pain after the punch. Director Edward Bernds remembered getting McIntyre to give Shemp the blows:

Copyright status
Brideless Groom is one of four Columbia Stooge shorts that fell into the public domain after their copyright expired in the 1960s, the other three being Disorder in the Court (1936), Sing a Song of Six Pants (1947), and Malice in the Palace (1949). As such, these four shorts frequently appear on budget VHS and DVD compilations.

See also
 List of American films of 1947
 List of films in the public domain in the United States
 Public domain film

References

External links

 
 
 
 Brideless Groom complete film on YouTube

1947 films
1947 comedy films
1947 short films
American black-and-white films
1940s English-language films
The Three Stooges films
Columbia Pictures short films
Films directed by Edward Bernds
Articles containing video clips
1940s American films